"Karma Chameleon" is a song by English band Culture Club, featured on the group's 1983 album Colour by Numbers. The single was released in the United Kingdom in September 1983 and became the second Culture Club single to reach the top of the UK Singles Chart, after "Do You Really Want to Hurt Me". The record stayed at number one for six weeks and became the UK's biggest-selling single of the year 1983, selling 955,000 copies (according to Official Charts Company sales data confirmed in March 2021 for the Channel 5 show Britain's Favourite 80s Songs). To date, it is the 38th-biggest-selling single of all time in the UK, selling over 1.52 million copies.

It also spent three weeks at number one on the US Billboard Hot 100 in early 1984, becoming the group's biggest hit and only US number-one single among their many top-10 hits. The single sold over 7 million copies globally. In 2015, the song was voted by the British public as the nation's ninth favourite 1980s number one in a poll for ITV.

Background
In an interview, Culture Club frontman Boy George explained: "The song is about the terrible fear of alienation that people have, the fear of standing up for one thing. It's about trying to suck up to everybody. Basically, if you aren't true, if you don't act like you feel, then you get Karma-justice, that's nature's way of paying you back." In response to claims from singer-songwriter Jimmy Jones that the song plagiarizes his hit "Handy Man", George stated, "I might have heard it once, but it certainly wasn't something I sat down and said, 'Yeah, I want to copy this.'" In an interview with 60 Minutes Australia, Boy George said that he wrote the song while he was on vacation in Egypt, and that the other members of Culture Club were initially hesitant to record it as they felt it sounded like a country song.

The harmonica part was played by Judd Lander, who had been a member of Merseybeat group The Hideaways in the 1960s. The song was originally to be called "Cameo Chameleon"; the band was recorded in interviews in mid-1983 stating this was to be the title of their next single. "Karma Chameleon" is written in the key of B major.

Reception
Cash Box said that "with Boy George’s smooth lead (and the catchy background vocals), it has the air of an immediate Stateside hit."

The song won Best British Single at the 1984 Brit Awards. In 2015 the song was voted by the British public as the nation's 9th favourite 1980s number one in a poll for ITV.

Other appearances
The group performed the song as a finale when they appeared in the 1986 episode "Cowboy George" of The A-Team.

Likely because of the line "I'm a man without conviction" and the chorus, which includes the word chameleon, "Karma Chameleon" has been used by several politicians in political adverts. In 2006, Britain's Labour Party used "Karma Chameleon" as the theme song for a series of political advertisements against Conservative Party leader David Cameron in the 2006 UK local elections.

Music video

The music video, directed by Peter Sinclair, was filmed at Desborough Island in Weybridge during 1983.

The video is set in Mississippi in 1870. It depicts a large multiracial group of people in 19th century dress, including some dressed in red, gold, and green (as referenced in the lyrics). Boy George is dressed in what would be known as his signature look: colourful costume, fingerless gloves, long braids, and a black bowler hat.

A pickpocket and jewelry thief is seen wandering through the crowd, stealing from unsuspecting victims. The band and everyone board a riverboat, The Chameleon, as Boy George continues to sing. While four men are playing poker, the thief is discovered cheating by giving himself the Royal Flush, and is forced to return all his ill-gotten gains and walk the plank at the points of ladies' parasols, falling into the river. As the video ends, day has turned to evening and the party continues on the boat as it cruises down the river.

Single cover artwork
The sleeve features work from the photographer David Levine.

Charts

Weekly charts

Year-end charts

All-time charts

Sales and certifications

Parodies
In 1984, country music artists Moe Bandy and Joe Stampley recorded "Where's the Dress", a satirical song about Boy George which sampled "Karma Chameleon". The song reached number 8 on the Hot Country Songs chart.

The United Australia Party created "Palmer Chameleon", a parody of "Karma Chameleon" promoting the party and leader Clive Palmer in particular, as part of the soundtrack of their "Clive Palmer: Humble Meme Merchant" mobile video game. Boy George and Culture Club's manager have said that the unauthorised use of the song constitutes copyright infringement, and have stated that their record label would be dealing with the matter.

See also

List of best-selling singles by year in the United Kingdom
List of number-one singles in Australia during the 1980s
List of number-one singles from the 1980s (New Zealand)
List of number-one singles of the 1980s (Switzerland)
List of UK Singles Chart number ones of the 1980s
List of Dutch Top 40 number-one singles of 1983
List of European number-one hits of 1983
List of number-one singles of 1983 (Ireland)
List of number-one singles of 1983 (Spain)
List of Billboard Hot 100 number-one singles of 1984
List of Cash Box Top 100 number-one singles of 1984
List of number-one singles of 1984 (Canada)
List of number-one singles and albums in Sweden
VG-lista 1964 to 1994

References

1983 songs
1983 singles
1984 singles
Billboard Hot 100 number-one singles
Cashbox number-one singles
Culture Club songs
Dutch Top 40 number-one singles
European Hot 100 Singles number-one singles
Irish Singles Chart number-one singles
Number-one singles in Australia
Number-one singles in Finland
Number-one singles in New Zealand
Number-one singles in Norway
Number-one singles in South Africa
Number-one singles in Spain
Number-one singles in Sweden
Number-one singles in Switzerland
RPM Top Singles number-one singles
Song recordings produced by Steve Levine
Songs written by Boy George
Songs written by Jon Moss
Songs written by Mikey Craig
Songs written by Phil Pickett
Songs written by Roy Hay (musician)
UK Singles Chart number-one singles
Ultratop 50 Singles (Flanders) number-one singles
Virgin Records singles
Brit Award for British Single